West Gateway Marriott Hotel is a skyscraper building located in Zhongzheng District, Taipei, Taiwan. The building was originated designated as a Marriott Hotel, however due to the COVID-19 pandemic, the tourism industry has been greatly affected. Therefore, in 2020, the use of the skyscraper was changed to an office building instead.

See also 
 List of tallest buildings in Taiwan
 List of tallest buildings in Taipei
 Solaria Nishitetsu Hotel Taipei

References

2022 establishments in Taiwan
Office buildings completed in 2022
Skyscraper office buildings in Taipei
Skyscraper hotels in Taipei